Basil Milton McCormack (3 August 1904 – 19 February 1973) was an Australian rules footballer who played in the Victorian Football League (VFL) between 1925 and 1936 for the Richmond Football Club.

Family
The son of Michael McCormack and Mary McCormack (1865–1950), née Foley, he was born at Rochester, Victoria on 3 August 1904.

Richmond
A left-foot kick, recruited from Rochester, he played 200 senior games for the Richmond Football Club as a half-back flanker, and represented Victoria on 13 occasions.

Double debut
Granted his clearance from Rochester to Richmond on Friday, 1 May 1925, he played his first match for Richmond, selected on the half-back flank, against Hawthorn, on 2 May 1925 (round 1). He played well; with the match report noting that "McCormack … who marks and kicks well, [was] looking a very likely man". 

It was also the Hawthorn team's first match in the VFL competition, the former VFA club having been admitted (along with Footscray and North Melbourne) in the January of that year.

Tribunal
He was suspended on two occasions: the first arose from the final on 14 September 1929 for striking (eight weeks), and the second was on 6 May 1933 for elbowing (six weeks).

New Town Football Club
Approached by Cananore in 1936, he was appointed captain-coach of the Tasmanian Football League's New Town Football Club in 1937. He was captain-coach for three seasons (1937 to 1939), and played a number of senior games in 1940.

Franklin Football Club
In 1947 he was appointed coach of the Franklin Football Club in the Huon Football Association.

St Virgil's Old Scholars Football Club
He coached St. Virgil's in the Tasmanian Amateur Football League from 1948 to 1950.

Military
Having enlisted in the militia in 1939, the transferred to the Second AIF in 1943, and saw action in the Pacific Islands.

See also
 1927 Melbourne Carnival

Footnotes

References 

 Hogan P: The Tigers Of Old, Richmond FC, Melbourne 1996
 Richmond Football Club – Hall of Fame

External links
 
 
 Boyles Football Photos: Basil McCormack
 Photograph: Victorian Football League (Team), Visit to Western and South Australia, 1 to 16 July 1929 (State Library of Victoria).
 Militia Enlistment Form: Basil Milton McCormack (TX14087), National Archives of Australia.
 World War Two Nominal Roll: Staff Sergeant Basil Milton McCormack TX14087 (T492357)

1904 births
1973 deaths
Richmond Football Club players
Richmond Football Club Premiership players
Jack Dyer Medal winners
Rochester Football Club players
Australian rules footballers from Victoria (Australia)
Two-time VFL/AFL Premiership players
Australian Army personnel of World War II
Australian Army soldiers
Military personnel from Victoria (Australia)